The Stlatlimx Tribal Police Service (STPS) is the police force for St'at'imc (or Stlʼatlʼimx) aboriginal peoples of British Columbia. The STPS is the only aboriginal police service in British Columbia. Their officers are appointed as designated provincial constables, and have full police powers on and off-duty throughout the province. They are based in Lillooet and Mount Currie.

Communities served consist of the N'Quatqua (Anderson Lake), Lil'wat (Mount Currie), Samahquam (Baptiste-Smith), Sekw'el'was (Cayoose Creek), Skatin (Skookumchuck), T'it'q'et (Lillooet), Tsalalh (Seton Lake), Ts'kw'aylaxw (Pavilion), Xa'xtsa (Douglas), and Xaxli'p (Fountain).

History 

In 1986 the Lillooet first nation band council established a security program where officers patrolled reserves and worked with the RCMP to prevent and prosecute crime. In 1988 the council built on the security program by forming the peacekeepers for the communities of T'itq'et, Tsalalth, and Lil'wat.

By 1992, the Solicitor General of British Columbia and seven Stlatlimx communities established a tribal policing project. An agreement with the RCMP formalized a partnership and the RCMP's role as the primary policing authority in the participating communities. In 1999, the BC Police Act was amended to include designated policing agencies. The STPS were re-established under Section 4.1 of the act as a designated policing agency.

Structure 

STPS is the only First Nations Administered Police Service (FNAPS) in British Columbia. Modeled on the structure of an independent municipal police department, the department is governed by a police board selected from the communities served. Police officers appointed by the board are either experienced officers or graduates of the Justice Institute of British Columbia, Police Academy.

In 2013, the Stlatlimx Tribal Police had an authorized strength of 9 police officers.

See also 
 Aboriginal police in Canada
 List of law enforcement agencies in British Columbia
 E-Comm

References

External links 
 STPS website

Law enforcement agencies of British Columbia
Law enforcement agencies of First Nations in Canada
1992 establishments in British Columbia
Government agencies established in 1992
First Nations organizations in British Columbia